The Internazionali di Tennis di Manerbio – Trofeo Dimmidisì is a tennis tournament held in Manerbio, Italy since 1999. The event is part of the ''ATP challenger series and is played on outdoor clay courts.

Past finals

Singles

Doubles

External links 
Official website
ITF Search 

ATP Challenger Tour
Antonio Savoldi–Marco Cò – Trofeo Dimmidisì
Clay court tennis tournaments
Tennis tournaments in Italy